Aram Barlezizyan was born on 12 of September 1937 (died on 5th of March 2022) to an Armenian family. He moved to Armenia in his early adulthood. He began to attend Brusov State University specialising in the field of foreign languages. At the same time he became a respectable professional accordion player. He lived and worked as an academic in Yerevan, Armenia. He continuously developed his profession, seeking new horizons of academic knowledge. He is survived by his two children, three grandchildren and four great-grandchildren.

Work and Profession
At the age of 38 Aram Barlezizyan defended his Doctorate in Brusov University of Linguistics. Since then he has studied the French language as his chosen profession for over 50 years. At the same time he promoted the French language and culture within Eastern Europe and the Middle East. 
Prof. Barlezizyan has written many academic journal articles, contributed to various books and has written a 40,000 word (inclusive of 30,000 word variations) Armenian-French dictionary. His Academic Journal Articles cover areas such as word history, word developments, word variations, methodological patterns to list a few.  Prof. Barlezizyan has also written multiple textbooks for the use in Brusov University.

Achievements

Barlezizyan is most notable a recipient of:
 Medal of Movses Khorenatsi - awarded for outstanding achievements in the spheres of culture, art, literature, education, social sciences in Armenia.
 Medal of “Drastamat Kanayan” - awarded to officers and ensigns who have had significant input in the spheres of army building, development of ARM military-educational system and military-patriotic education of the young generation, and to individuals who have had considerable input in establishing and strengthening the Armenian Army.
 Ordre des Palmes Académiques (Order of Academic Palms) in 2006. - He was given this Honour for his continuous effort and knowledge developed in the field of Linguistics. He was acknowledged internationally for his work and his devotion to his field of research.

References

External links
 Dictionnaire Arménien-Français, Yerevan, 2009. (Armenian-French dictionary authored by Aram Barlezizyan)
 Dictionnaire Français-Arménien, Yerevan, 2010. (French-Armenian dictionary co-authored by Aram Barlezizyan)

1936 births
Linguists from Armenia
Living people
Chevaliers of the Ordre des Palmes Académiques
Armenian lexicographers